Sandal Soap Factory is a metro station on the Green Line of the Namma Metro serving orion mall area of Bangalore, India. It was opened to the public on 1 March 2014.

Station layout

Entry/Exits

See also
Bangalore
List of Namma Metro stations
Transport in Karnataka
List of metro systems
Mysore Sandal Soap
List of rapid transit systems in India

References

External links

 Bangalore Metro Rail Corporation Ltd. (Official site) 
 UrbanRail.Net – descriptions of all metro systems in the world, each with a schematic map showing all stations.

Namma Metro stations
Railway stations in India opened in 2014
2014 establishments in Karnataka
Railway stations in Bangalore